Runde is a surname. Notable people with the surname include:

Daniel Fitzgerald Runde (born 1972), American management consultant
James A. Runde, American banker and corporate director
Ortwin Runde (born 1944), German politician 
Øystein Runde (born 1979), Norwegian comics writer and comics artist